Believe in Me is Duff McKagan's first solo album, released on September 28, 1993. At its peak, the album reached #137 on the Billboard 200 and is believed to have sold about 100,000 copies worldwide.

Recording
Believe in Me features such notable guests as Duff's, at the time Guns N' Roses bandmates Slash, Matt Sorum, Dizzy Reed and Gilby Clarke, Skid Row members Sebastian Bach, Rob Affuso and Dave Sabo, Lenny Kravitz and Jeff Beck.

The song, "You Can't Put Your Arms Around a Memory", from the Guns N' Roses album, "The Spaghetti Incident?", was recorded during the sessions for this album.

"Man in the Meadow" is an elegy to McKagan's late friend Todd Crew of Jetboy.

Promotion
In 1993, a 3 track single "Believe in Me" was released with b-sides "Bambi" (a cover of Prince) and "Cracked Actor" (a cover of David Bowie). Promo singles "Punk Rock Song", "Man in the Meadow" and "I Love You" were also released.

A music video for the song "Believe in Me" was also released  in 1993 and received minimal airplay on MTV. It is mostly compiled of low quality videos of Duff McKagan during his touring and recording time.

Track listing 
All songs written by Duff McKagan except "Bambi" written by Prince and "Cracked Actor" written by David Bowie
 "Believe in Me" (featuring Slash) – 3:23
 "I Love You" – 4:14
 "Man in the Meadow"  (featuring West Arkeen) – 4:50
 "(Fucked Up) Beyond Belief" (featuring Jeff Beck and Matt Sorum) – 3:29
 "Could It Be U" (featuring Dizzy Reed) – 3:04
 "Just Not There" (featuring Slash) – 3:34
 "Punk Rock Song" – 1:37
 "The Majority" (featuring Lenny Kravitz) – 3:10
 "10 Years" (featuring Gilby Clarke) – 4:29
 "Swamp Song" (featuring Jeff Beck) – 3:04
 "Trouble" (featuring Sebastian Bach and Dave "The Snake" Sabo) – 3:12
 "Fuck You" (featuring Doc from Dox Haus Mob)– 3:24
 "Lonely Tonite" (featuring Dave "The Snake" Sabo) – 3:03
Bonus tracks on 2009 Japanese reissue

Personnel
 Duff McKagan – lead vocals, rhythm guitar, bass, synthesizer, piano, drums, backing vocals
 Joie Mastrokalos – lead guitar (touring band member), backing vocals on "Swamp Song" and "Fuck You"
 Richard Duguay – bass (touring band member)
 Aaron Brooks – drums (touring band member)
 Teddy Andreadis – organ, clavinet
 Slash – lead guitar on "Believe in Me" and "Just Not There"
 Dizzy Reed – piano, farfisa organ, backing vocals on "Could It Be You"
 Matt Sorum – drums on "(Fucked up) Beyond Belief"
 Gilby Clarke – rhythm guitar and backing vocals on "10 Years"
 Jeff Beck – lead guitar on "(Fucked up) Beyond Belief" and "Swamp Song"
 Lenny Kravitz – vocals on "The Majority"
 Sebastian Bach – vocals on "Trouble"
 Dave "The Snake" Sabo – guitar on "Trouble" and "Lonely Tonite"
 West Arkeen – guitar on "Man in the Meadow", "Swamp Song" and "Fuck You"
 Rob Affuso – drums on "Swamp Song" and "Fuck You"
 Bobbie Brown – backing vocals on "Believe In Me"
 London McDaniel – bridge vocals on "Man in the Meadow", percussion on "The Majority"
 Doc Newman – rap vocals on "Fuck You"

Charts

References

1993 debut albums
Geffen Records albums
Duff McKagan albums